Kunathip Yea-on (born 18 August 1995) is a Thai judoka.

He competed at the 2016 Summer Olympics in Rio de Janeiro, in the men's +100 kg.

References

External links 
 

1995 births
Living people
Kunathip Yea-on
Kunathip Yea-on
Judoka at the 2016 Summer Olympics
Southeast Asian Games medalists in judo
Kunathip Yea-on
Competitors at the 2015 Southeast Asian Games
Kunathip Yea-on